is a Japanese violinist.

Brief history
Hiroka was born at Suginami-ku, Tokyo in 1995.
She lived at Aoba-ku, Yokohama City from age of three. She began to learn the violin from the age of four, and made her debut at Philia Hall three months later. She was observed as "extremely gifted and blessed a huge potential capacity" and it was said that she "will undoubtedly grow into a unique musical personality" by Zakhar Bron at seven years old.
At the age of nine, she gave her first recital in Budapest, Hungary. At the age of thirteen in 2008, she played and conducted the Franz Liszt Chamber Orchestra for The Four Seasons of Vivaldi.

At The National Art Center, Tokyo in 2009, she played a smaller violin, which had been used by Mozart in childhood.
This attracted attention as the first concert using that particular small violin, which was made in 1746, outside of Austria.

In Japan, Hiroka studied under Koichiro Harada, a professor of Toho Gakuen School of Music, and Gérard Poulet. She was given a scholarship by the Toho Gakuen School of Music Soloist Diploma course. Hiroka studied under professor Boris Kuschnir, Boris Brovtsyn and others at Konservatorium Wien and University of Music and Performing Arts, Vienna.

In 2009-2011 Hiroka got a scholarship of Yamaha Music Foundation. In 2012-2013, she was also awarded a music scholarship from The Meiji Yasuda Cultural Foundation.
She studied in Vienna for three years starting in the fall of 2014 as a trainee of an up-and-coming artists overseas study program of the Agency for Cultural Affairs of Japan.
She received a bachelor's degree from the Music and Arts University of the City of Vienna in three years, and graduated with the highest grade in 2019. Since 2018, she has been enrolled in the Faculty of Policy Management at Keio University and has performed both at home and abroad.

Awards
 2006 -  (Poland), Junior Division, Second Prize (youngest)
 2007 - All Japan Students Music Competition, Elementary School Part, First Prize (the highest score in all parts)
 2009 - Yehudi Menuhin Award (highest award) - Kronberg Academy (Germany)
 2009 - IMA Music Awards - Ishikawa Music Academy
 2010 - ABC Rookie Concert, First Prize (youngest) - ABC Music for the Promotion of Science

 2015 - Fidelio Competition. Winner (Vienna)
 2016 - International Chamber Music Competition Città di Pinerolo e Torino Città metropolitana. 3rd place (Italy) 
 2016 - The Art of Duo, Boulder International Chamber Music Competition. 3rd place (USA)

Recitals 
Hiroka opened the following recitals in Japan.

2009-04 - Tsuda Hall (Shibuya-ku, Tokyo)
2011-03 - Yokohama Minato Mirai Hall
2011-04 - Philia Hall
2011-07 - JT Art Hall Affinis ... Dolphin Trio
2011-09 - Musashino Civic Cultural Hall ... Piano: Eliane Reyes
2011-10 - Nakano ZERO, Planetarium
2011-11 - Nakano ZERO, Large Hall
2012-05 - Act Tower Music Workshop Hall
2014-11 - Philia Hall - Aoba-ku 20th Anniversary Concert
 2018-09 - Takashi Sato & Hiroka Matsumoto Duo Recital
 2018-09 - Takeshi Takehashi & Hiroka Matsumoto Duo Recital

Concerts 
In Japan

2008 - Kanagawa Philharmonic Orchestra (conductor: Kazumasa Watanabe, Yoko Matsuo) - Suntory Hall, Great Hall
2008 - Tokyo Symphony Orchestra (conductor: Naoto Otomo, Norichika Iimori) - Suntory Hall, Great Hall
2009 - Tokyo City Philharmonic Orchestra (conductor: Ryusuke Numajiri) - Showa Women's University Hitomi Kinen Kōdō ... "Untitled Concert"
2009 - Kanagawa Philharmonic Orchestra (conductor: Yoko Matsuo) - Kanagawa Prefectural Civic Hall, Great Hall
2010 - Tokyo Symphony Orchestra (conductor: Norichika Iimori) - Muza Kawasaki Symphony Hall
2010 - Orchestra Ensemble Kanazawa (conductor: Michiyoshi Inoue) - Ishikawa Ongakudō
2011 - Osaka Century Symphony Orchestra (conductor: Shigeo Genda) - The Symphony Hall ... ABC Fresh Concert
2011 - Yamaha Music Scholarship Concert, Vol. 2 - Yamaha Hall
2011 - New Japan Philharmonic (conductor: Jonathan Schiffman) - Musashino Civic Cultural Hall
2012 - Japan Philharmonic Orchestra (conductor: Mitsuhashi Keiko) - Suginami Public Hall, Great Hall
 2019 Barrier-free concert—Let's Come Together—István Kohán & Hiroka Matsumoto Joint Concert. Philia Hall

Outside Japan

2008 - Franz Liszt Chamber Orchestra - Budapest
2010 -  subscription concert (conductor: Kálmán Berkes) - Hungary

Filmography

TV
 Video.

Gyor Philharmonic Orchestra subscription concert was broadcast in Slovakia on 2010-12.

References

Japanese classical violinists
1995 births
Living people
Musicians from Kanagawa Prefecture
21st-century classical violinists
Women classical violinists